The lowest common divisor is a term often mistakenly used to refer to:

Lowest common denominator, the lowest common multiple of the denominators of a set of fractions
Greatest common divisor, the largest positive integer that divides each of the integers